Cleopatra Gibson Tucker (born April 9, 1943) is an American Democratic Party politician, who has served in the New Jersey General Assembly since 2008, where she represents the 28th Legislative District.

Biography
Tucker was born and raised in Birmingham, Alabama. She attended Tennessee State University, majoring in sociology. After moving to Newark, New Jersey, in 1966, she was hired by the Newark Housing Authority in 1976. She retired from the Authority in 2002.  She is currently the executive director of a non-profit organization called The Centre, Inc. The Centre's headquarters was named after her late husband, Donald Kofi Tucker, in 2006.

Tucker has two grown children with her late husband and is a resident of Newark's Weequahic neighborhood.

Political career
After Donald Tucker, who was both a Newark councilman and an Assemblyman, died in October 2005 and posthumously won re-election to his Assembly seat, Assemblyman Tucker was replaced in a special election convention by Evelyn Williams, who was elected to serve the remaining month of the term and to serve the first year of the full term. Williams resigned from the Assembly in January 2006 before the start of the new session, following her arrest for shoplifting, creating a vacant seat. A special election convention appointed Democratic Party activist Oadline Truitt to the seat for the first half of the term and she was re-elected in a November 2006 special election. In Truitt's first bid for a full two-year term, Tucker and Essex County Freeholder and former Assemblyman from the 1960s-1970s Ralph R. Caputo defeated Truitt and incumbent Assemblyman Craig A. Stanley in the June 2007 Democratic primary. Tucker and Caputo had the backing of Newark Mayor Cory Booker. Tucker has subsequently won re-election to the Assembly every two years since then.

In January 2011, Tucker introduced a bill that would require every bicycle in the state of New Jersey to display a license plate, which would be registered with the government for a small fee. Within about a week, she withdrew her proposal.

Committees 
Committee assignments for the current session are:
Military and Veterans' Affairs, Chair
Human Services
Telecommunications and Utilities

District 28 
Each of the 40 districts in the New Jersey Legislature has one representative in the New Jersey Senate and two members in the New Jersey General Assembly. The representatives from the 28th District for the 2022—23 Legislative Session are:
 Senator Renee Burgess  (D)
 Assemblyman Ralph R. Caputo  (D)
 Assemblywoman Cleopatra Tucker  (D)

References

External links
Assemblywoman Tuckers' legislative webpage, New Jersey Legislature
Assembly Majority Web site
New Jersey Legislature financial disclosure forms - 2007 2008 2009 2010  2011  2012  2013  2014  2015  2016

1943 births
Living people
African-American state legislators in New Jersey
Democratic Party members of the New Jersey General Assembly
Tennessee State University alumni
Politicians from Newark, New Jersey
Politicians from Birmingham, Alabama
Women state legislators in New Jersey
21st-century American politicians
21st-century American women politicians
21st-century African-American women
20th-century African-American people
20th-century African-American women